Faxonius cooperi, the Flint River crayfish, is a species of crayfish in the family Cambaridae. It is endemic to the United States. The common name refers to the Flint River, where the original specimens were found.

References

Cambaridae
Fauna of the United States
Freshwater crustaceans of North America
Crustaceans described in 1980
Taxa named by Horton H. Hobbs Jr.
Taxobox binomials not recognized by IUCN